Maria Dancheva (born 12 April 1995) is an international volleyball player from Bulgaria. She participated in the
2017 FIVB Volleyball Women's U23 World Championship, and
2019 FIVB Volleyball Women's Nations League.

References 

1995 births
Living people
Bulgarian women's volleyball players
Middle blockers
Sportspeople from Pazardzhik